Qaṣabah al-'Aqabah is one of the districts  of Aqaba governorate, Jordan.

References 

Districts of Jordan